Giancarlo Polidori (born 30 October 1943 in Sassoferrato, Italy) is a former Italian professional road bicycle racer. His career highlights include stage wins in Tirreno–Adriatico, the Giro d'Italia and the Tour de Romandie as well as wins in the one-day Italian semi-classics the Giro del Lazio, GP Montelupo, Tre Valli Varesine, the Giro di Toscane, the Trofeo Melinda and the Sassari-Cagliari. In addition he wore the yellow jersey as leader of the general classification for one day in the 1967 Tour de France.

Palmarès 

1965
 national amateur road race champion
1967
Tour de France:
Wearing yellow jersey for one day
1968
Giro del Lazio
1969
Ardea
Giro d'Italia:
Winner stage 1
1970
GP Montelupo
1971
Giro del Veneto
Giro di Toscana
GP Cemab
Tre Valli Varesine
1972
Sassari - Cagliari
1973
Giro dell'Umbria
1974
Faenza
Sassari - Cagliari
GP Industria
1976
Martorano

References

External links 

Official Tour de France results for Giancarlo Polidori

Italian male cyclists
Italian Giro d'Italia stage winners
1943 births
Living people
Sportspeople from the Province of Ancona
Tour de Suisse stage winners
Cyclists from Marche